Manuel da Costa (10 June 1926 – 20 April 2020) was a Portuguese sports shooter. He competed in the 50 metre rifle, prone event at the 1964 Summer Olympics.

References

1926 births
2020 deaths
Place of birth missing
Portuguese male sport shooters
Olympic shooters of Portugal
Shooters at the 1964 Summer Olympics